Paul-Napoléon Roinard (4 February 1856 – 26 October 1930) was a French anarchist poet.

Works 
 Nos plaies, poésies, cover drawn by the author, Paris, Soc. typographique, 1886, in-18 ;
 Chanson d’Amour, poetry, music by Louis Hesse. Paris, Durdilly. s. d., en feuille ;
 Six étages, récit en vers, Paris, Ed. Girard, s. d., en feuille ;
 Berceuse, poetry, s. 1. n. d. [Paris, Ed. Girard], 2 ff., la couverture sert de titre (50 exempl.).
 À Dieu, s’il existe, Paris, chez l’auteur, 7, rue Pixérécourt, s. d., en feuille, ;
 La Mort du Rêve, poems, Paris, Soc. du Mercure de France, 1902, in-8° ;
 Sur l’Avenue sans fin, poem, Paris et Reims, Revue de Paris et de Champagne (et chez l’auteur), 1906, in-8°.
 Portraits du prochain siècle (1894) ;
 La Poésie symboliste. Trois entretiens sur les temps héroïques, période symboliste, au Salon des artistes indépendants, 1908. Nos maîtres et nos morts, par P.-N. Roinard. Les Survivants, par Victor-Émile Michelet. La Phalange nouvelle, par Guillaume Apollinaire (1908) ;
 Les Miroirs, moralité lyrique en cinq phases, huit stades, sept gloses et en vers, Éd. de « la Phalange », 1908 ;
 La Légende rouge, synthèse d'idées et de caractères révolutionnaires, suivi d'un débat sur Le nombre et la rime et d'un ballet-mimodrame, La Ronde des fleurs (1921) ;
 Chercheurs d'impossible. Contre-partie du Donneur d'illusions, féerie tragique, 5 acts, 11 tableaux, in verse, 1929.

Prefaces and notices 
 Portraits du prochain siècle, Paris, Girard, 1894, in-18.
 Œuvres posthumes de Paul Audricourt. Paris, Mouillot, 1902, in-18 ;
 Soirée d’Art social. Programme illustré par Deluermoz.

Sources 
 Adolphe van Bever, Paul Léautaud, Poètes d'aujourd'hui, t. 2 Paris, Mercure de France, 1908, (p. 178-82)
  : notice biographique.

Bibliography 
 Léon Bloy, Léon Bloy devant les cochons, Paris, Chamuel, 1894, in-18 ;
 Léon Bloy, Le Mendiant ingrat, Bruxelles, Deman, 1898, in-18 ;
 Léon Bocquet, « P.-N. Roinard », Le Beffroi (Lille), octobre 1902 ;
 Jean Court, Le Cantique des Cantiques au Théâtre d’Art, Mercure de France, janvier 1892 ;
 Georges Docquois, Le Congrès des Poètes, Paris, Bibliothèque artistique et littéraire, 1894, in-16 ;
 Félicien Fagus, « P.-N. Roinard », La Revue des Beaux-Arts et des Lettres, 1 May 1899 ; Sur le même, La Revue Blanche, 1 November 1902.
 A.-M. Gossez, Poètes du Nord. 1880-190S, morceaux choisis, accompagnés d’un essai bio-bibliographique, etc., Paris, Ollendorff, 1902, in-18.
  Julien Leclercq, « Roinard », notice dans les Portraits du prochain siècle, Paris, Girard, 1894, in-18 ;
 M.-C. Poinsot, Anthologie des poètes normands contemporains (Portraits de P.-N. Roinard), Paris, Floury, s. d., in-16.
 Anonyme, « Banquet à Roinard » La Plume, 15 juin 1902 ;
 Anonyme, Échos. Les Fêtes Cornéliennes de Rouen, Mercure de France, juillet 1904 ;

Iconography 
 Louis Anquetin: oil portrait, 1885 (belongs to M. Roinard) ; oil portrait in [Exposition des Portraits du prochain siècle, chez Le Barc de Boutteville, 1893] (belongs to M. Roinard), reprod. in la Revue Encyclopédique, 15 November 1893 ;
 A. Brière, « Croquis », La Plume, 15 June 1892 ;
 F. Courché: Dessin à la plume, reprod. in le Messager Parisien, 1888.

External links 
 Paul-Napoléon Roinard on data.bnf.fr
 Paul-Napoléon Roinard on wikisource

19th-century French poets
20th-century French poets
French anarchists
Writers from Normandy
People from Seine-Maritime
1856 births
1930 deaths